Gianni Marchetti (Rome, 7 September 1933 – Rome, 10 April 2012) was an Italian composer and songwriter. He collaborated with Piero Ciampi, lyricist Mogol, singer  Bobby Solo and others. He also contributed to the soundtracks of around forty films. He also composed a number of solo albums including solstitium and equinox.

Selected filmography 
 
 Tears on Your Face (1964)
 The Wild Eye (1967)  
 Kill Me Quick, I'm Cold (1967) 
The Killer Likes Candy (1968)
 Congo Hell (1969)
 The Last Desperate Hours (1974) 
 Emanuelle's Revenge (1975) 
 SS Girls (1977)
 Ready for Anything (1977)

References

External links

Italian songwriters
Male songwriters
1933 births
2012 deaths
20th-century Italian musicians
Italian film score composers
Musicians from Rome
Italian male film score composers
20th-century Italian male musicians